The 1907–08 season was Blackpool F.C.'s 11th season (eighth consecutive) in the Football League. They competed in the twenty-team Division Two, then the second tier of English football, finishing fifteenth.

Bob Whittingham, signed from amateur side Goldenhill Wanderers, was the club's top scorer, with fifteen goals in his 31 league games.

Season synopsis
A strong start to the season, with only one point dropped from their opening two fixtures, was tempered with a run of four consecutive defeats.

It took until the fifteenth League match — against Lincoln City at Bloomfield Road — to gain their second victory. The 4–3 scoreline included a hat-trick from William Grundy.

Nine victories in the second half of the campaign left them ten points clear of bottom club Lincoln at the season's end.

The club's FA Cup trip ended at the First Round stage, this time at Manchester United.

Table

Player statistics

Appearances

League
Bob Crewdson – 37
 Jack Scott – 35
Jack Parkinson – 33
Bob Whittingham – 31
T. Clarke – 27
William Grundy – 26
Jimmy Connor – 23
William Weston – 22
William Fiske – 21
Edward Threlfall – 20
Horace Brindley – 19
Stephen Tillotson – 17
W.H. Reid – 16
William Birch – 13
J. Gow – 13
Adam Haywood – 13
Hugh Rimmer – 13
John Waddington – 11
Horace King – 10
Ginger Owers – 9
Frederick Rose – 6
Walter Cookson – 2
W. Lowe – 1

Players used: 23

FA Cup
Horace Brindley – 1
Jimmy Connor – 1
Bob Crewdson – 1
William Fiske – 1
J. Gow – 1
William Grundy – 1
Adam Haywood – 1
Jack Parkinson – 1
 Jack Scott – 1
Edward Threlfall – 1
William Weston – 1

Players used: 11

Goals

League
Bob Whittingham – 15
William Grundy – 12
William Weston – 5
William Birch – 3
Ginger Owers – 3
Horace Brindley – 2
J. Gow – 2
Jack Parkinson – 2
Walter Cookson – 1
Jimmy Connor – 1
Adam Haywood – 1
Horace King – 1
W.H. Reid – 1
 Jack Scott – 1
Edward Threlfall – 1

League goals scored: 51

FA Cup
William Grundy – 1

FA Cup goals scored: 1

Transfers

In

Out
The following players left after the final game of the previous season:

Notes

References

Blackpool F.C.
Blackpool F.C. seasons